D&W may refer to:

 D&W Fresh Market, an American grocery store chain
 D&W Performance, an American engine and drivetrain component distributor
 D&W Railroad, a shortline railroad in Iowa, U.S.
 Darien and Western Railroad, a railroad in Georgia, U.S., 1894–1906

See also 
 D. and W. Henderson and Company, a Scottish marine engineering and shipbuilding company, 1872–1936
 Dash and Will, an Australian indie pop/pop rock duo
 Demons and Wizards (disambiguation)
 Dundas & Wilson, a UK commercial law firm